Pultenaea retusa, commonly known as notched bush-pea, is a species of flowering plant in the family Fabaceae and is endemic to eastern continental Australia. It is an erect shrub with wedge-shaped or egg-shaped leaves with the narrower end towards the base, and yellow to orange and red to purple flowers.

Description

Taxonomy
Pultenaea retusa was first formally described in 1805 by James Edward Smith in the Annals of Botany. The specific epithet (retusa) refers to the leaves, that often have a notch at the end.

Distribution and habitat
Notched bush-pea grows in forest and heathland on swampy sites on the coast and nearby tablelands of Queensland, New South Wales, and Victoria as far west as Melbourne.

References

Fabales of Australia
Flora of New South Wales
Flora of Victoria (Australia)
Flora of Queensland
retusa
Plants described in 1805
Taxa named by James Edward Smith